The Canara pearlspot (Etroplus canarensis), also known as banded chromide or Canara pearlspot cichlid, is an endangered species of cichlid endemic to South Karnataka in India.

Habitat and distribution 
It belongs to a small genus of species of cichlids from Asia, and unlike other members of the genus Etroplus it does not occur in brackish waters, being found in freshwater only.

Size 
It reaches a length of  TL.

In the aquarium
It is a much sought out cichlid, somewhat rare in hobby aquariums. In the recent past there have been some reports of breeding in captivity.

References

External links 
E canarensis cichlid-forum.com

Canara pearlspot
Cichlid fish of Asia
Fish of India
Endemic fauna of India
Fish described in 1877
Taxa named by Francis Day